John Gavin (born 1979) is a Scottish comedian who won the Scottish comedian of the year in September 2009.

References 

Place of birth missing (living people)
1979 births
Living people
Scottish male comedians